Neighborhood House is a 1936 American comedy film directed by Charley Chase, Harold Law, and Alan Hale, Sr. and written by Charley Chase, Harold Law, Richard Flournoy, and Arthur Vernon Jones. The film stars Charley Chase, Rosina Lawrence, Darla Hood, George Meeker, Ben Taggart, and Dick Elliott. Originally produced as a 55-minute feature first titled Bank Night and then Neighborhood House, the film faced legal action from the actual Bank Night corporation, which organized cash giveaways in America's movie theaters. The film was withdrawn, cut down to 22 minutes, and released as a standard Charley Chase short by Metro-Goldwyn-Mayer.

The often cited release date of May 9, 1936, is erroneous. That was when the unreleased feature version was scheduled for distribution; the Motion Picture Herald trade review of the feature was published on May 9. The short-subject version was released later in the year.

Plot
Charley Chase and his wife and daughter look forward to their weekly visit to the local movie theater, a "neighborhood house." The special attraction of the evening is "Bank Night," a cash award given to the holder of a lucky-number ticket. The theater manager, a former beau of Mrs. Chase, greets the Chases cordially and wishes them luck. He selects Chase's little daughter to pick the lucky number, but she calls out Chase's number. The audience cries fraud, so another number is chosen -- and it belongs to the little girl herself. Again the audience howls in protest. A third number is chosen -- and it belongs to Mrs. Chase. After the manager awards her the $500 jackpot, the outraged audience members form a motorcade, honking their horns furiously, and follow the embarrassed Chase family all the way home. Chase, mortified, resolves the situation by staging his own "Bank Night" giveaway at the theater.

Cast 
Charley Chase as Charley Chase
Rosina Lawrence as Rosina Chase
Darla Hood as Mary Chase
George Meeker as Adolph
Ben Taggart as Policeman
Dick Elliott as Perkins 
Harry Bowen as Irate Movie Patron

Deleted material
The 55-minute version included a subplot, in which gangsters raid the theater and hold Chase captive; this footage was removed. Featured players Margaret Irving, George Chandler, Charles Lane, and Tom Dugan were cast in the feature, but they do not appear in the revised short-subject version.

References

External links 
 

1936 films
American comedy films
1936 comedy films
Metro-Goldwyn-Mayer films
American black-and-white films
1930s English-language films
1930s American films